The 2008 SEC men's basketball tournament took place on March 13–16, 2008 in Atlanta, Georgia. The first, quarterfinal, and semifinal rounds were televised by Raycom/LF Sports, and the SEC Championship Game was produced by CBS and televised by ESPN2. The University of Georgia, the improbable winner of the tournament, earned the Southeastern Conference's automatic bid to the 2008 NCAA tournament.

The tournament was originally scheduled to be played at the Georgia Dome, but a tornado struck downtown Atlanta on the night of March 14, while the third of four quarterfinal games was in overtime. While that game was completed, SEC officials decided not to risk playing the fourth game, between the University of Kentucky and University of Georgia.  That quarterfinal was subsequently postponed until Saturday morning. That game and all subsequent games were played at Alexander Memorial Coliseum on the campus of Georgia Tech, a school in the Atlantic Coast Conference (and coincidentally a former SEC member). Due to the smaller capacity, only the players' families, credentialed media, school officials and 400 fans from each school were allowed to attend the rest of the tournament.

Georgia, which had a sub-.500 record (13–16, 4–12 in the SEC) going into the tournament and had to win the title to secure an NCAA Tournament bid, was forced to play and win three games in the space of 30 hours, including two games on Saturday — the original quarterfinal game against Kentucky that was postponed by the tornado and venue change, and the subsequent semifinal game. Coincidentally, Georgia won the SEC tournament championship on the home court of its bitter rival, Georgia Tech. This was Georgia's first SEC men's basketball tournament championship since 1983.

Final SEC Regular Season Standings and Awards

Standings

Bracket

* Denotes game ended in overtime.
† Game originally scheduled for 9:45 p.m. the day before. Postponed due to tornado.
‡ - Game was originally to have been telecast on CBS.

All-Tournament Team
Sundiata Gaines, Georgia (Most Valuable Player)
Terrance Woodbury, Georgia
Charles Thomas, Arkansas
Darian Townes, Arkansas
Mykal Riley, Alabama

Game delays and relocation

During overtime of the Friday night quarterfinal between Mississippi State and Alabama, a tornado hit the Georgia Dome at 9:40 p.m. The National Weather Service had issued a tornado warning at 9:26 p.m., because radar indicated a thunderstorm capable of producing a tornado. The storm tore open a panel on the north side of the dome; sheared bolts and insulation fell into the arena. After the storm passed, the teams returned to the court at 10:30 and completed the game.

The Kentucky–Georgia basketball game, originally scheduled for Friday night, was postponed. It was rescheduled for Saturday at noon.  Due to the severe damage suffered at the Georgia Dome, the remainder of the tournament was moved to Georgia Tech's Alexander Memorial Coliseum. The semifinals began at 6:00pm Saturday in Alexander Memorial Coliseum. Because the games were moved to a significantly smaller arena, only players' families & friends, bands, cheerleaders, and persons with working credentials were admitted. The SEC looked at several possible scenarios; one specifically mentioned by media involved playing only the Kentucky-Georgia game on Saturday, playing both semifinals on Sunday, and declaring the semifinal winners co-champions. However, tournament officials were told by the NCAA tournament selection committee (which included SEC commissioner Michael Slive) that it had to finish the tournament in order to preserve the league's automatic bid to the NCAA tournament.

The championship game was originally slated to be televised by CBS but was bumped to ESPN2 after the SEC opted to move the tip time to 3:30 p.m. (EDT). The move to ESPN2 was because CBS televised the Big Ten tournament final at 3:30 p.m. However, CBS still produced the game, with announcers Verne Lundquist and Bill Raftery calling the game.  All CBS affiliates in the finalists' home markets also carried the game.

References

SEC men's basketball tournament
-2008 SEC Menand#39;s Basketball Tournament
SEC Men's b
Basketball in Georgia (U.S. state)